Esperanza is a municipality (municipio) of the Valverde province in the Dominican Republic. Within the municipality there are four municipal districts (distritos municipal): Boca de Mao, Jicomé, Maizal and Paradero.

As of the 2002 census the municipality had a total population of 70,588 inhabitants, 52,732 living in its urban settlements and 17,856 in its rural districts (Secciones). 
For comparison with other municipalities and municipal districts see the list of municipalities and municipal districts of the Dominican Republic.

History

A village founded in 1495 on the lands of Cacique Caonabo, it ceased to exist for a century and a farmhouse and a herd reappeared at the beginning of the 17th century.

When the cities of Guajaba, Puerto Real de Bayajá, and Monte Cristi were destroyed during the government of Antonio Osorio, this population was forced to emigrate to the southern part of the country and those who did not accept this order founded the Hato Esperanza, among others, this being the place occupied by the Municipality of Esperanza today.

It is from the first decades of the 19th century when it begins to have a nuance of more organized settlers in small scattered groups, and in the mid-1900s with the installation of the Esperanza mill, it becomes even more organized, in Esperanza Caña and Esperanza Pueblo.

On June 19, 1875, the Hato de Esperanza was elevated to a Cantonal Post, depending on the province of Santiago de los Caballeros, through decree No. 1433; later it is converted into Common of the same province, when the political constitution of September 9, 1907, was dictated, which abolished the name of Cantonal Post.

The conversion of Esperanza into a Cantonal Post originated from a request raised by the inhabitants of the town and section, addressed to the National Congress supported by the governor of the province of Santiago.

When the province of Valverde was created through Law 4882 of March 27, 1958, the municipality was segregated from the Province of Santiago de los Caballeros as of January 1, 1959 and became part of the new province.

Notable people 
 José Leclerc (born 1993), Major League Baseball Pitcher
 Seranthony Domínguez (born 1994), major league baseball pitcher
 Giselle Tavera, bachata singer
 David Ortiz, Major league baseball first baseman
 Hector Noesi, Major league baseball pitcher

References

Populated places in Valverde Province
Municipalities of the Dominican Republic